Walter Grubmüller (born 13 January 1989 in Vienna) is an Austrian racing driver.

Career

Karting
Beginning his karting career in his native Austria in 2000, Grubmüller did not move up into the major international series until 2002, with an appearance at the South Garda Winter Cup. Competing in the ICA Junior class in 2003, Grubmüller finished seventh in the European Championship, and finished tied 24th with Luxembourg's Samuel Curridor, in the Italian Open Masters. Grubmüller continued at the ICA Junior level in 2004, combining a karting campaign with appearances in the Formula Renault Monza series. He moved to MGM Racing to drive one of their Birel karts, finishing eighth in the Andrea Margutti Trophy, and third behind Philipp Eng and Marco Wittmann in the Italian Open Masters.

Formula Renault
Grubmüller entered four races of the Formula Renault Monza series in 2004, for 1600cc-specification cars. He amassed eight points over those races, while competing for the BVM Minardi team. Moving to Jenzer Motorsport for 2005, Grubmüller competed in the Eurocup and Italian championships before competing in the Italian winter series later in the season. He failed to score any points in the pan-European series, with a best finish of 13th at Estoril. He scored three points in the main Italian series, and added twelve in the Winter Series. His best result of the season came in the four-race Winter Series, with fourth at Adria. Grubmüller stayed with Jenzer into 2006, and continued in both the pan-European and Italian championships. Results slowly improved, despite not scoring any points before he completed a mid-season move to Twincam Motorsport. A fifth and an eighth first time out at Donington Park were his only points-scoring finishes as he finished 19th in the championship. He also finished 20th in the Italian championship, with a best result of sixth at Hockenheim.

Formula Three
After three Asian Formula Three races in 2006 and four races in Australian Formula Three in early 2007, Grubmüller moved to British Formula 3 for the 2007 season. His father Walter had bought into the Hitech Racing team, and installed his son as one of the drivers alongside Marko Asmer. Grubmüller finished only four of the races in the points, while Asmer won eleven races to lift the series title. In the international races, Grubmüller finished 18th at the Macau Grand Prix, while he failed to finish at the Masters of Formula 3 event at Zolder. At the end of the season, Grubmüller competed in three more Asian F3 races for Aran Racing, achieving two podiums for a ninth place championship finish.

Asmer left the team so Grubmüller had a new team-mate for the 2008 campaign. Max Chilton joined the Austrian, and once again Grubmüller was outpaced by his team-mate. His consistency did improve over the course of the season but failed to crack the podium as his best finish was fourth, coming at the 1000 km of Monza-supporting rounds, and finished fourteenth in the championship. He was edged out by just a single point by John Martin at the final round at Donington. He impressed in Macau, finishing as top Hitech driver in eighth beating both Chilton and Roberto Merhi, who joined the team for a one-off drive.

2009 saw a great change in Grubmüller's results, and became a surprise championship contender. Hitech had originally planned to run just Grubmüller in the series, but Sam Abay was signed up in the run up to the opening round. Sadly for Hitech, Abay could not acquire a work permit for the UK, and had to return to Australia. Grubmüller achieved his first two podiums in Formula Three at that first round, at Oulton Park. Before the second round, Renger van der Zande was signed up to drive a second Hitech car, to help Grubmüller. He took his first win at Hockenhim, before adding a second win at Donington. However, Daniel Ricciardo had a significant enough lead to claim the title with a round to spare in the Algarve. Van der Zande had also moved ahead of Grubmüller in the standings, but with van der Zande returning to the Formula Three Euroseries to compete for Motopark Academy in Barcelona, Grubmüller had the chance to seal the runner-up spot, at the final round at Brands Hatch which was being held on the same weekend. Grubmüller did so with two fifth places, allowing him to overhaul his team-mate by ten points.

Formula Renault 3.5 Series

Towards the end of 2008, Grubmüller tested a Formula Renault 3.5 Series car for the first time with leading British team P1 Motorsport at the Paul Ricard circuit in France. The relationship continued in 2009 when Grubmüller tested for the team again at Motorland Aragón and Barcelona and in January 2010, it was announced that he would drive for the team in the 2010 season, racing alongside fellow rookie Jan Charouz.

Racing record

Career summary

† – As Grubmüller was a guest driver, he was ineligible for points.

Complete Formula Renault 3.5 Series results
(key) (Races in bold indicate pole position) (Races in italics indicate fastest lap)

† Driver did not finish the race, but was classified as he completed more than 90% of the race distance.

References

External links

 Career statistics from Driver Database

1989 births
Living people
Sportspeople from Vienna
Austrian racing drivers
World Series Formula V8 3.5 drivers
Italian Formula Renault 1.6 drivers
British Formula Three Championship drivers
Australian Formula 3 Championship drivers
Asian Formula Three Championship drivers
Formula Renault Eurocup drivers
Italian Formula Renault 2.0 drivers
Toyota Racing Series drivers
Formula 3 Sudamericana drivers
Auto GP drivers
P1 Motorsport drivers
Hitech Grand Prix drivers
Jenzer Motorsport drivers
BVM Racing drivers
Charouz Racing System drivers